Lodge is originally a term for a relatively small building, often associated with a larger one.

Lodge or The Lodge may refer to:

Buildings and structures

Specific 
 The Lodge (Australia), the official Canberra residence of the Prime Minister of Australia
 The Lodge (Indianapolis, Indiana), an apartment building on the National Register of Historic Places
 The Lodge (audio mastering), a recording facility in Manhattan, New York City
 The Lodge, an historic building and place name in Apopka, Florida, United States
 John C. Lodge Freeway, colloquially known as the Lodge, in Detroit, Michigan
 RSPB The Lodge, nature reserve and headquarters of the Royal Society for the Protection of Birds
 The Lodge at Pebble Beach, hotel and clubhouse in Pebble Beach, California

Types 
 Lodge, a dwelling for a beaver, an aquatic mammal
 Lodge, a building for temporary or seasonal lodging, such as:
 Hunting lodge, a building that is built to accommodate hunters
 Mountain hut, a hostel for trekkers, very often called a lodge
 Safari lodge, also called a game lodge, a type of tourist accommodation in southern and eastern Africa
 Ski lodge, a building that is purpose-built to support the sport of snow skiing
 Lodges, the houses used by the Chi Psi fraternity chapters
 Small trading stations of French India
 "Sufi lodge", known as a khanqah (or tekke)

Organizations and enterprises 
 Lodge (company), an American cookware manufacturer
 Benevolent and Protective Order of Elks, local orders and their meeting halls are called lodges
 Local union, some trade unions have local organizations called lodges
 Grand Lodge of fraternal organization
 Masonic Lodge, the basic organization of Freemasonry
 Odd Fellows Lodge (disambiguation), the basic organisation of the Order of Odd Fellows
 Orange Lodge, the basic organisation of the Orange Institution

Arts, entertainment, and media

Music
 Lodge (Beaver album) (1999)
 Lodge (Fanu and Bill Laswell album) (2008)
 The Lodge (band), a 1980s art-rock band

Television
 The Lodge (TV series), 2016 British series based on the Israeli series North Star
 The Lodge, a 1993 British series starring David Thwaites

Other arts, entertainment, and media
 The Lodge (comics), a fictional government organization from Malibu Comics' Ultraverse imprint
 The Lodge (film), a 2019 horror film

Places

United States 
 Lodge, Illinois, an unincorporated community
 Lodge, Missouri, an unincorporated community
 Lodge, South Carolina, a town
 Lodge, Virginia, an unincorporated community

Elsewhere 
 Lodge, County Londonderry, a townland in County Londonderry, Northern Ireland 
Lodge, an abandoned hamlet in the parish of Stonebeck Up in North Yorkshire, England
 Lodge Causeway, a road in Bristol
 Lodge Hill, Bristol, a hill and residential area of Bristol, England
 The Lodge, Nova Scotia, Canada

People 
 Lodge (surname), a list of people and characters with the surname
 Lodge family, a New England political family
 Lodge de Montmorency, 1st Viscount Frankfort de Montmorency (1747-1822), Irish politician
 Lodge Kerrigan (born 1964), American screenwriter and film director

Schools
 Lodge School (Malaysia), Kuching, Sarawak, a private school
 The Lodge School, Barbados, a public secondary school

See also 
 
 Gatehouse or "gate lodge", a building round the entrance of a larger building
Lodge 49, a 2018 AMC-TV series
 Porters' lodge, a place near the entrance of a building where one or more porters can be found
 Sweat lodge, a ceremonial structure used by Native Americans
 Tipi, a conical tent, traditionally made of animal skins, and wooden poles, used by the Native American nomadic tribes of the Great Plains
 Wigwam, a domed, round shelter used by numerous Native American cultures
 Lodging (disambiguation)
 Hunting lodge (disambiguation)